In Mormonism, gifts of the Spirit are spiritual endowments that provide benefits to the recipient and to those he or she serves. The seventh Article of Faith states: "We believe in the gift of tongues, prophecy, revelation, visions, healing, interpretation of tongues, and so forth." Both males and females can receive spiritual gifts. They are an important component in both the basic beliefs and daily living of Mormons.

Mode of acquisition
While some Charismatic Christians believe that spiritual gifts are an arbitrary endowment of grace, an important Mormon idea is that spiritual gifts can be bestowed by God upon an individual through diligent seeking and righteous living. Some gifts are developed in the premortal existence. Other spiritual gifts are developed during mortal life and identified by priesthood blessings. For example, many Mormons receive a patriarchal blessing which can reveal some spiritual gifts by revelation. For those who are members of the Church of Jesus Christ of Latter-day Saints (LDS Church), this blessing is recorded and saved in the official church archives.

In contemporary Church Of Jesus Christ Of Latter Day Saints Living, spiritual gifts are most often associated with the gift of the Holy Ghost, which is bestowed by the laying on of hands following baptism in an ordinance called confirmation. During the ordinance, the person being confirmed will receive the verbal admonition to "receive the Holy Ghost." From this point forward, the person will be entitled to the constant companionship of the Holy Spirit if they have faith in Jesus Christ and are in a state of true repentance. The recipient will also be entitled to receive personal revelation.

There is no clear consensus among Mormon thinkers on whether or not non-Mormons, who have not received the gift of the Holy Ghost, can enjoy spiritual gifts. Early Mormon references do not stress the idea that spiritual gifts are entirely predicated on the gift of the Holy Ghost, while contemporary opinions often do. However, the LDS Church's official website has the following quote, "As the Prophet Joseph Smith taught, the gifts of the Spirit 'are obtained through that medium' [the Holy Ghost] and “cannot be enjoyed without the gift of the Holy Ghost. … The world in general can know nothing about them.” (Teachings of the Prophet Joseph Smith, comp. Joseph Fielding Smith, Salt Lake City: Deseret Book Co., 1938, pp. 243, 245; see also Elder Marion G. Romney in Conference Report, Apr. 1956, p. 72.)

Purpose
Many Mormons believe that spiritual gifts may be received according to the needs and capacity of the individual and to the needs of others around him or her. These gifts are given to benefit those who love God in their journey towards eternal life. They also serve as signs of true believers.

Controversy
The belief that spiritual gifts exist in the present age is called continuationism by some theologians and religious studies scholars. In contrast, the belief that spiritual gifts no longer operate is called cessationism. Continuationists generally believe that cessationists lack faith. Consistent with the rationalism of the modern age, cessationists generally believe continuationists are either deceivers or mentally unhealthy.

Historical development and de-emphasis
In the early-nineteenth century, the claim of Mormons to supernatural spiritual gifts was very common. Spiritual gifts were promoted in hymns, such as "The Spirit of God Like a Fire Is Burning", which was included in the first Latter Day Saint hymnal in 1835. However, with the passage of time, supernaturalism has been deemphasized as a normative expression within Mormonism. This de-emphasis is consistent with the general pattern of a young and charismatic religious movement experiencing the petrification of charisma because of new doctrinal standards, fixed rituals, and the policy making of bureaucratic institutions.

In regards to the gift of tongues, some early Mormons claimed that their glossolalia ("speaking in tongues in a sacred language unknown to any human") was an expression of the pure Adamic language. However, beginning in June 1839, glossolalia was de-emphasized in favor of the less supernatural xenoglossia ("speaking in tongues in a language that could have been learned by natural means"). In regards to the gift of healing, stand alone expressions of supernatural healing have been de-emphasized in favor of comforting the sick via priesthood blessings under institutional sponsorship. Today, few Mormons claim to experience supernaturalism, though there is a greater belief in supernatural gifts within Mormon fundamentalism as compared to the LDS Church. When supernaturalism is claimed in contemporary Mormonism, there is a tendency to attribute the experience to a direct act of God instead of an indirect act through the mediation of spiritual gifts.

Appendix: list of Spiritual Gifts in early Mormonism
Some of the spiritual gifts found in early Mormon-exclusive sources include:

gifts of prophecy (including both testimony and prediction abilities),
gifts of knowledge and wisdom,
inspiration to praise and glorify God and rejoice,
allowing the receiver to act as a conduit of the messages of God to humanity,
receiving inspired, correct words in difficult circumstances,
the power to create or restore life,
receiving confirmation of identity and affiliation,
gifts of hope and perfect love (charity),
ability to lead church meetings,
ability to establish the church and faith of God, and identify those chosen by God to priesthoods and callings,
ability to receive general and specific inspiration about daily living,
gifts of faith,
ability to discern spirits (including physiognomy and clairvoyance),
gifts of healing others and the ability to be healed,
gifts of working miracles,
gifts of tongues,
ability to cast out devils and demons (exorcism),
divine investiture of authority and priesthood,
remission of sins and purification,
ability to receive general help (wishes),
gifts of angelic ministration,
ability to receive and interpret dreams (sleeping visions),
protection (rescue) from enemies, serpents, poisons, injury, devils, evil, and all trouble,
safeguarding of the home,
warnings of danger,
ability to pass unnoticed or untouched,
gifts of waking visions and ascension,
ability to remember things once known (memory),
ability to control weather;
gifts of health, prosperity, and success,
gifts of posterity,
gifts of peace and comfort,
respect from the world leaders,
gifts of divine glory and transfiguration,
ability to wither, consume, burn, shake, shock, or kill enemies;
ability to bless (bind) and curse (loose | repel) an individual or group for keeping or defying the law of God,
gift of eternal life (deification).

See also

List of articles about Mormonism

References

Appendix Notes

Latter Day Saint belief and doctrine
Holy Spirit